Kofi Amankwaa Peasah (born 18 February 1938) is a Ghanaian politician and a member of the first Parliament of the fourth Republic representing the
Amansie West constituency in the Ashanti Region of Ghana. He represented the National Democratic Congress.

Early life and education
Kofi Amankwaa Peasah was born on 18 February 1938 at Manso Nkwanta in the Ashanti Region of Ghana. He attended Mfantsipim School and the University of Ghana where he obtained his Bachelor of Arts degree in history.

Politics
Peasah was elected into parliament on the ticket of the National democratic Congress for the Amansie West Constituency in the Ashanti Region of Ghana during the 1992 Ghanaian parliamentary election.

Career
Peasah is a teacher by profession and a former member of parliament for the Amansie West Constituency in the Ashanti Region of Ghana. He is a fellow of the Historical Society of Ghana.

Personal life
He is a Christian.

References

Ghanaian MPs 1993–1997
Academic staff of the University of Ghana
National Democratic Congress (Ghana) politicians
Ghanaian Christians
Ghanaian educators
Living people
1938 births
People from Ashanti Region